Indiana Juniper Black (formerly Devin Ryanne Mohr), known online as Froskurinn, is an American color commentator best known for hosting the English broadcast of the League of Legends Pro League, League of Legends European Championship, and Xplay.

Career

Before she began coaching, Black was a semi-professional League of Legends player. In 2014, she joined Robert Morris University Illinois as League of Legends coach. After one year with the team, she left for a coaching role with a professional Chinese team Roar. She was also a coach for Team Dignitas EU until 2015.

Black began her casting career in 2015 after joining the English broadcast team of the League of Legends Pro League (LPL) and became the first English-speaking woman to commentate a live, professional League of Legends match. In 2019, Black left the LPL to join the League of Legends European Championship (LEC) broadcast team. She left the LEC in 2021.

Black co-hosted Xplay on the relaunched G4 network. In a January 2022 episode, Black criticized sexism in the gaming industry, stating that the viewers of the program objectified the previous G4 hosts Morgan Webb and Olivia Munn. On September 14, 2022, the network announced that 20-30 staff members had been laid off. Black responded to the layoffs by tweeting a GIF saying "I survived." This was the subject of backlash from viewers, with many saying the post was insensitive to the employees who were laid off. Later that week, Comcast, the parent company of G4, bought out the remainder of Black's contract, terminating her employment.

Personal life
Black grew up in Portland, Oregon. She married in 2020 and identifies as gay.

References

1990s births
Living people
21st-century American women
American lesbians
American media critics
American television hosts
American women television writers
American women television presenters
Women in esports
Women video game critics
Esports coaches
People from Portland, Oregon